Jonas Gregaard Wilsly (born 30 July 1996) is a Danish cyclist, who currently rides for UCI ProTeam .> In October 2020, he was named in the startlist for the 2020 Giro d'Italia.

Major results

2014
 1st  Road race, National Junior Road Championships
2015
 1st  Road race, National Under-23 Road Championships
 1st Stage 2 (TTT) ZLM Tour
 10th Ringerike GP
2016
 1st Himmerland Rundt
 1st  Mountains classification, Tour de Normandie
 5th Coupe des Carpathes
 6th Ringerike GP
 10th Sundvolden GP
2017
 1st  Overall Kreiz Breizh Elites
1st  Young rider classification
 3rd Overall Tour of Małopolska
1st  Young rider classification
 6th GP Viborg
 10th Overall Danmark Rundt
 10th Ringerike GP
2018
 1st Stage 4 (TTT) Tour de l'Avenir
 3rd Overall Giro della Valle d'Aosta
 4th Overall Tour of Małopolska
1st  Young rider classification
2021
 9th Vuelta a Murcia
2022
 6th Overall Route d'Occitanie
 7th Overall Tour de Luxembourg
2023
 1st  Mountains classification, Paris–Nice

Grand Tour general classification results timeline

References

External links

1996 births
Living people
Danish male cyclists
People from Herlev Municipality
Sportspeople from the Capital Region of Denmark
21st-century Danish people